John Ford (1893 – 3 May 1917) was a Scottish professional footballer who played as an outside right in the Football League for Preston North End.

Personal life 
After working in munitions in Scotland, Ford was called up to serve as a private in the Cameronians (Scottish Rifles) during the First World War. He was killed in France on 3 May 1917 and is commemorated on the Arras Memorial.

Career statistics

Honours 
Preston North End

 Football League Second Division second-place promotion: 1914–15

References

1893 births
1917 deaths
Sportspeople from Wishaw
Scottish footballers
English Football League players
Association football outside forwards
Bellshill Athletic F.C. players
British Army personnel of World War I
Cameronians soldiers
British military personnel killed in World War I
Preston North End F.C. players
Scottish Junior Football Association players
Footballers from North Lanarkshire
Military personnel from North Lanarkshire